Anuwat Sermsiri (born 10 September 1968) is a Thai sprinter. He competed in the men's 4 × 100 metres relay at the 1988 Summer Olympics.

References

1968 births
Living people
Athletes (track and field) at the 1988 Summer Olympics
Anuwat Sermsiri
Anuwat Sermsiri
Place of birth missing (living people)